Theodore Howard McCaleb (February 10, 1810 – April 29, 1864) was a United States district judge of the United States District Court for the District of Louisiana, the United States District Court for the Eastern District of Louisiana and the United States District Court for the Western District of Louisiana.

Education and career

Theodore Howard McCaleb was born in Pendleton District, South Carolina on February 10, 1810. He was educated at Phillips Exeter Academy, and attended Yale University, but left before graduating. He read law in 1832, and entered private practice in New Orleans, Louisiana from 1832 to 1841. He was a member of the faculty at the University of Louisiana (now Tulane University) from 1847 to 1864. serving as a professor from 1847 to 1864, and as dean of faculty from 1850 to 1862.

Federal judicial service

McCaleb was nominated by President John Tyler on September 1, 1841, to a joint seat on the United States District Court for the Eastern District of Louisiana and the United States District Court for the Western District of Louisiana vacated by Judge Philip Kissick Lawrence. He was confirmed by the United States Senate on September 3, 1841, and received his commission the same day. McCaleb was reassigned by operation of law to the United States District Court for the District of Louisiana on February 13, 1845, to a new seat authorized by 5 Stat. 772. McCaleb was reassigned by operation of law to the United States District Court for the Eastern District of Louisiana on March 3, 1849, to a new seat authorized by 9 Stat. 401. His service terminated on January 28, 1861, due to his resignation.

Later career and death

Following his resignation from the federal bench, McCaleb resumed private practice in New Orleans from 1861 to 1864. He died on April 29, 1864, at his plantation in Claiborne County, Mississippi.

References

Sources
 

1810 births
1864 deaths
Yale College alumni
Judges of the United States District Court for the Western District of Louisiana
Judges of the United States District Court for the Eastern District of Louisiana
Judges of the United States District Court for the District of Louisiana
United States federal judges appointed by John Tyler
19th-century American judges
United States federal judges admitted to the practice of law by reading law
Tulane University faculty